United States v. Reese, 92 U.S. 214 (1876), was a voting rights case in which the United States Supreme Court narrowly construed the 15th Amendment to the United States Constitution, which provide that suffrage for citizens can not be restricted due to race, color or the individual having previously been a slave.

This was the Supreme court voting rights case under the Fifteenth Amendment and the Enforcement Act of 1870. A Kentucky electoral official had refused to register an African‐American's vote in a municipal election and was indicted under two sections of the 1870 act: section 1 required that administrative preliminaries to elections be conducted without regard to race, color, or previous condition of servitude; section 2 forbade wrongful refusal to register votes where a prerequisite step “required as foresaid” had been omitted.

The Court held that the Fifteenth Amendment did not confer the right of suffrage, but it prohibited exclusion from voting on racial grounds. The justices invalidated the operative section 3 of the Enforcement Act since it did not repeat the amendment's words about race, color, and servitude. They ruled that the section exceeded the scope of the Fifteenth Amendment.

Results

Following the ruling, states began to adopt measures that were designed to exclude Black Americans from voting, while keeping within the constraints of the Fourteenth Amendment as interpreted by the Court. They adopted devices such as poll taxes (which many poor black and white sharecroppers, who lived on credit, did not have ready cash to pay); literacy tests, usually subjectively administered by white election officials, who tended in practice to exclude even educated Black people which was often very rare; grandfather clauses, which admitted voters whose grandfathers had voted as of a certain date, chosen to also excluded Black Americans; and more restrictive residency requirements, which disqualified people who had to move to follow work. 

As these measures were challenged in court, beginning with Mississippi's new constitution in 1890 that included them, the Supreme Court upheld their use, as formally they applied to all voters. The court did not believe it had a role in overseeing the practice or effect of these measures, which white Democrats quickly used to disenfranchise most black voters across the South. Through 1910, all the former Confederate states passed new constitutions or amendments to achieve disfranchisement.

External links
 

United States Fifteenth Amendment case law
United States Supreme Court cases
United States Supreme Court cases of the Waite Court
Criminal cases in the Waite Court
1876 in United States case law
African-American history between emancipation and the civil rights movement